Melbourne Robert Cranshaw (December 3, 1932 – November 2, 2016) was an American jazz bassist. His career spanned the heyday of Blue Note Records to his recent involvement with the Musicians Union. He is perhaps best known for his long association with Sonny Rollins. Cranshaw performed in Rollins's working band on and off for over five decades, starting with a live appearance at the 1959 Playboy jazz festival in Chicago and on record with the 1962 album The Bridge.

Cranshaw died at the age of 83 on November 2, 2016, in Manhattan, New York, from Stage IV cancer.

Discography

As sideman

With Pepper Adams
Pepper Adams Plays the Compositions of Charlie Mingus (Workshop Jazz, 1964)
With Nat Adderley
Little Big Horn! (Riverside, 1963)
Sayin' Somethin' (Atlantic, 1966)
With Eric Alexander
Second Impression (HighNote, 2016)
With Mose Allison
Hello There, Universe (Atlantic, 1970)
With Gene Ammons
Gene Ammons and Friends at Montreux (Prestige, 1973)
With Carole Bayer Sager
 Carole Bayer Sager (Elektra Records, 1977)
With Kenny Barron
Sunset to Dawn (Muse, 1973)
With George Benson
 Goodies (Verve, 1968)
 Giblet Gravy (Verve, 1968)
With Walter Bishop Jr.
Cubicle (Muse, 1978)
With Paul Bley
BeBopBeBopBeBopBeBop (SteepleChase, 1990)
With Jonathan Butler
Introducing Jonathan Butler (Jive, 1985)
With Jaki Byard
Out Front! (Prestige, 1964)
With Donald Byrd
Up with Donald Byrd (Verve, 1964)
I'm Tryin' to Get Home (Blue Note, 1965)
With Johnny Coles
Little Johnny C (Blue Note, 1963)
With Judy Collins
Running for My Life (Elektra, 1980)
With Hank Crawford
Wildflower (Kudu, 1973)
With Sonny Criss
Up, Up and Away (Prestige, 1967)
The Beat Goes On! (Prestige, 1968)
Rockin' in Rhythm (Prestige, 1969)
With Frank Foster
Manhattan Fever (Blue Note, 1968)
With George Freeman
Man & Woman (Groove Merchant, 1974)
With Debbie Gibson
 Think with Your Heart (EMI, 1995) 
With Dexter Gordon
Gettin' Around (Blue Note, 1965)
Clubhouse (Rec. 1965; Blue Note, 1979)
Blues à la Suisse (Prestige, 1973)
With Bunky Green
Visions (Vanguard, 1978)
With Grant Green
Idle Moments (Blue Note, 1963)
Matador (Blue Note, 1964)
Solid (Blue Note, 1964)
With Friedrich Gulda
Ineffable (Columbia, 1965)
With Slide Hampton
Explosion! The Sound of Slide Hampton (Atlantic, 1962)
With Barry Harris
Chasin' the Bird (Riverside, 1962)
Luminescence! (Prestige, 1967)
With Eddie Harris
Cool Sax from Hollywood to Broadway (Columbia, 1964)
With Hampton Hawes
Playin' in the Yard (Prestige, 1973)
With Coleman Hawkins
Sirius (Pablo, 1966 [1974])
With Jimmy Heath
The Gap Sealer (Cobblestone, 1972)
Love and Understanding (Muse, 1973)
With Joe Henderson
Inner Urge (Blue Note, 1964)
With Maurice Hines
To Nat "King" Cole with Love (Arbors, 2005)
With Johnny Hodges
Joe's Blues (Verve, 1965) with Wild Bill Davis
Blue Notes (Verve, 1966)
With Bobby Hutcherson
Happenings (Blue Note, 1966)
The Kicker (Rec. 1963; Blue Note, 1999)
With Milt Jackson
Milt Jackson Quintet Live at the Village Gate (Riverside, 1963)
In a New Setting (Limelight, 1964)
Milt Jackson and the Hip String Quartet (Verve, 1968)
With Willis Jackson
West Africa (Muse, 1973)
Headed and Gutted (Muse, 1974)
With Antônio Carlos Jobim
Terra Brasilis (RCA Victor, 1980)
With J. J. Johnson
J.J.! (RCA Victor, 1964)
With Quincy Jones
 Golden Boy (Mercury, 1964)
I/We Had a Ball (Limelight, 1965)
With Clifford Jordan
Soul Fountain (Vortex, 1966 [1970])
With Eddie Kendricks
Vintage '78 (Arista, 1978)
With Eric Kloss
We're Goin' Up (Prestige, 1967)
Sky Shadows (Prestige, 1968)
With Irene Kral
Better Than Anything (Äva, 1963)
With Yusef Lateef
The Blue Yusef Lateef (Atlantic, 1968)
With Mike Longo
Talk with the Spirits (Pablo, 1976)
With Johnny Lytle
The Village Caller! (Riverside, 1963) 
The Loop (Tuba, 1965)
People & Love (Milestone, 1972)
With Junior Mance
Junior's Blues (Riverside, 1962)
That Lovin' Feelin' (Milestone, 1972)
With Barry Manilow
Barry Manilow II (Bell, 1974)
With Jack McDuff
Magnetic Feel (Cadet, 1975)
With Jimmy McGriff
Stump Juice (Groove Merchant, 1975)
The Groover (JAM, 1982)
With Jackie McLean
Right Now! (Blue Note, 1965)
With Carmen McRae
Sings Lover Man and Other Billie Holiday Classics (Columbia Records, 1962)
With MJT + 3
Walter Perkins' MJT + 3 (Vee-Jay, 1959)
Make Everybody Happy (Vee-Jay, 1960)
MJT + 3 (Vee-Jay, 1960)
Message from Walton Street (Rec. 1960; Koch Jazz, 2000)
With Hank Mobley
A Caddy for Daddy (Blue Note, 1966)
Hi Voltage (Blue Note, 1967)
Reach Out! (Blue Note, 1968) 
With Grachan Moncur III
Evolution (Blue Note, 1963)
With Wes Montgomery
Movin' Wes (Verve, 1964)
Bumpin' (Verve, 1965)
With James Moody
Moody and the Brass Figures (Milestone, 1966)
Don't Look Away Now! (Prestige, 1969)
With Lee Morgan
Take Twelve (Jazzland, 1962)
The Sidewinder (Blue Note, 1964)
Delightfulee (Blue Note, 1966)
The Gigolo (Blue Note, 1966)
With Oliver Nelson
Oliver Nelson Plays Michelle (Impulse!, 1966)
With Duke Pearson
Hush! (JazzLine, 1962)
Wahoo! (Blue Note, 1965)
Honeybuns (Atlantic, 1965)
Prairie Dog (Atlantic, 1966)
Introducing Duke Pearson's Big Band (Blue Note, 1967)
The Phantom (Blue Note, 1968)
Now Hear This (Blue Note, 1968)
How Insensitive (Blue Note, 1969)
It Could Only Happen with You (Blue Note, 1970)
With Houston Person
Chocomotive (Prestige, 1967)
Blue Odyssey (Prestige, 1968)
With Esther Phillips
Esther Phillips Sings (Atlantic, 1966)
With Dave Pike
Jazz for the Jet Set (Atlantic, 1966)
With Sonny Red
Breezing (Jazzland, 1960)
With Leon Redbone
From Branch to Branch (Atco, 1981)
With Irene Reid
Room for One More (Verve, 1965)
With Max Roach
Max Roach + 4 on the Chicago Scene (EmArcy, 1958)
With Sonny Rollins
The Bridge (RCA, 1962)
What's New? (RCA Victor, 1962)
Our Man in Jazz (RCA Victor, 1962)
Sonny Meets Hawk! (RCA Victor, 1963)
Now's the Time! (RCA Victor, 1964)
The Standard Sonny Rollins (RCA Victor, 1965)
Next Album (Milestone, 1972)
Horn Culture (Milestone, 1973)
Sonny Rollins in Japan (Victor, 1973)
The Cutting Edge (Milestone, 1974)
Nucleus (Milestone, 1975)
No Problem (Milestone, 1981)
Reel Life (Milestone, 1982)
G-Man (Milestone, 1986)
Falling in Love with Jazz (Milestone, 1989)
Here's to the People (Milestone, 1991)
Old Flames (Milestone, 1993)
Sonny Rollins + 3 (Milestone, 1995)
Global Warming (Milestone, 1998)
This Is What I Do (Milestone, 2000)
Without a Song: The 9/11 Concert (Rec. 2001; Milestone, 2005)
Sonny, Please (EmArcy, 2006)
Road Shows, Vol. 1 (Doxy, 2008)
Road Shows, Vol. 2 (Doxy, 2008)
With Charlie Rouse
 Moment's Notice (Storyville/Jazzcraft, 1978)
With Lalo Schifrin
Once a Thief and Other Themes (Verve, 1965)
With Shirley Scott
Great Scott!! (Impulse!, 1959)
Blue Flames with Stanley Turrentine (Prestige, 1964)
Queen of the Organ (Impulse!, 1964)
Latin Shadows (Impulse!, 1965)
Soul Song (Atlantic, 1968)
With Wayne Shorter
Second Genesis (Vee-Jay, 1960)
With Horace Silver
The Cape Verdean Blues (Blue Note, 1965)
Serenade to a Soul Sister (Blue Note, 1968)
In Pursuit of the 27th Man (Blue Note, 1972)
Silver 'n Brass (Blue Note,  1975)
With Paul Simon
 There Goes Rhymin' Simon (Columbia, 1973)
With Jimmy Smith
Hoochie Coochie Man (Verve, 1966)
With Rod Stewart
 Stardust: The Great American Songbook, Volume III (J Records, 2004)
With Billy Taylor
Impromptu (Mercury, 1962)
With Clark Terry and Bob Brookmeyer
Gingerbread Men (Mainstream, 1966)
With Bobby Timmons
Do You Know the Way? (Milestone, 1968)
With Stanley Turrentine
Hustlin' (Blue Note, 1964)
Joyride (Blue Note, 1965)
Rough 'n' Tumble (Blue Note, 1966)
Easy Walker (Blue Note, 1966)
The Spoiler (Blue Note, 1966)
Always Something There (Blue Note, 1968)
With McCoy Tyner
Live at Newport (Impulse!, 1963)
With Harold Vick
Watch What Happens (RCA Victor, 1968)
With Loudon Wainwright III
Loudon Wainwright III (Atlantic, 1970)
With Cedar Walton
The Electric Boogaloo Song (Prestige, 1969)
With Joe Williams
Me and the Blues (RCA Victor, 1964)
That Holiday Feelin' (Verve, 1990)
With Mary Lou Williams
Zoning (Mary, 1974)
With Victoria Williams
Happy Come Home (Geffen, 1987)
With Larry Willis
Just in Time (SteepleChase, 1989)
With Gerald Wilson
New York, New Sound (Mack Avenue, 2003)
With Jack Wilson
Easterly Winds (Blue Note, 1967)With Reuben WilsonThe Cisco Kid (Groove Merchant, 1973)With Kai WindingThe Incredible Kai Winding Trombones (Impulse!, 1960)
Dirty Dog (Verve, 1966)With The Young LionsThe Young Lions (Vee-Jay, 1960)With Joe Zawinul'Money in the Pocket'' (Atlantic, 1967)

References

External links
DTM interview

1932 births
2016 deaths
American jazz double-bassists
Male double-bassists
American jazz bass guitarists
Hard bop double-bassists
Musicians from Evanston, Illinois
Evanston Township High School alumni
American people of Malagasy descent
Soul-jazz bass guitarists
Deaths from cancer in New York (state)
Guitarists from Illinois
American male bass guitarists
20th-century American bass guitarists
Saturday Night Live Band members
Jazz musicians from Illinois
20th-century American male musicians
American male jazz musicians
Statesmen of Jazz members